The spacistor was a type of transistor developed in the 1950s as an improvement over the point-contact transistor and the later alloy junction transistor. It offered much higher speed than earlier transistors. It became obsolete in the early 1960s with the development of the diffusion transistor.

It is composed of a P-N junction with a wide depletion region, inside which two additional contacts are made: the injector and the modulator. The P material was called the base and the N material was called the collector. The injector acted like a BJT (bipolar junction transistor) emitter, the modulator like a base, and the collector like its BJT namesake. It achieved high speed by reducing the charge carrier's transit time.

References

External links
The Spacistor, A New Class of High-Frequency Semiconductor Devices March  1957 - prone to oscillation
The Spacistor July 1961 - operate to 25 Mc (MHz)

Transistor types